Zellers was a Canadian discount department retail chain that operated stores throughout Canada for 82 years. Founded in 1931 in London, Ontario, and later based in Brampton, Ontario, the company was purchased by the Hudson's Bay Company (HBC) in 1978. Zellers ceased operation in 2013 and its stores were closed. Following a stint re-using the brand name for a handful of HBC liquidation centres, a decade later in 2023, it was announced that the brand was relaunching within select Hudson's Bay stores, in an effort to revive the trademark name.

During its operating years, a series of acquisitions and expansions allowed Zellers to reach its peak in the 1990s, with 350 stores across the country in 1999. However, fierce competition by Walmart Canada and an inability to adjust to the increasingly volatile retailing industry resulted in Zellers losing significant ground in the 2000s. At the same time, HBC's new owner NRDC Equity Partners was focusing on bolstering and re-positioning Zellers' sister chain, The Bay, with an upscale and fashion-oriented direction, and saw Zellers as a detriment to the turnaround.

In January 2011, HBC announced that it would sell the lease agreements for up to 220 Zellers stores to the US chain Target for $1.825 billion. In turn, Target announced its intention to convert many of them to Canadian locations of Target, and re-sell the remainder to other parties such as Walmart Canada, resulting in their liquidation and eventual closure. While HBC retained 64 Zellers locations, it announced on July 26, 2012, that all of them would be liquidated and closed by March 31, 2013, due to their lack of profitability. After the chain ceased, HBC converted three Zellers-branded locations into liquidation outlets for The Bay (since renamed Hudson's Bay), with the last of those stores closing on January 26, 2020.

In August 2021, the Zellers brand was relaunched as a pop-up shop (store-within-a-store) at the Hudson's Bay store located in the Burlington Centre shopping mall in Burlington, Ontario. In August 2022, the Hudson's Bay Company announced it would be reviving the Zellers brand through online shopping and physical locations (more pop-up shops) in spring 2023.

History
On Saturday, August 4, 1928, Zellers Ltd was first established in London, Ontario. Walter P. Zeller, its founder, opened his new store and head office at 176 Dundas Street in London after working for years for Metropolitan Stores, F. W. Woolworth Company and Kresge's. The plan at the start was to have stores opened in London, St. Catharines, Niagara Falls, Fort William and Saint John, New Brunswick as part of an effort to establish a Canada-wide chain of department stores. Sixty women were hired for the opening day working in 21 different departments. Within months, Zellers was doing such good business that they were bought out by the American firm Schulte-United Ltd but within two years, the rebranded stores went bankrupt.

1930s–1960s: Early years, partnership with W.T. Grant

Zeller promptly bought fourteen Canadian locations of the failed Schulte-United chain, all located in Southern Ontario, and relaunched Zellers in late 1931 as a store for thrifty Canadians. One of the locations was the original Zellers at 176 Dundas Street in London, which would remain operating until the late 1980s. Almost immediately, Zellers initiated an aggressive expansion strategy. Within 25 years, Zellers operated 60 stores and employed 3,000 people. In 1952, in a move to expand into Atlantic Canada, it acquired the Federal Stores chain of variety stores, adding more than 12 new Zellers locations.

During this period of expansion, Zellers concluded a deal with W.T. Grant, a similar chain of American mass merchandise department stores. This arrangement allowed W.T. Grant to purchase 10 percent of Zellers shares and eventually a 51 percent ownership in 1959. In exchange, the Grant Company made available to Zellers its experience in merchandising, real estate, store development, and general administration. Zellers employees were sent to Grant stores and head office for training and the two companies made common buying trips to east Asia. In the 1950s, the chain again began opening new locations and in 1956, opened its first self-serve location at the Norgate shopping centre in Saint-Laurent, Quebec. Stores opened in 1960 employed many new innovations, including the first in-store restaurant, the first automotive centre and the first suburban location.

1970s–1980s: Acquisitions of Field and by HBC
In 1975, Zellers changed logo to the one it would keep for its remaining 45 years. By 1976, Zellers had grown to a chain of 155 stores, with annual sales of $407 million.

Although Zellers was prospering, W.T. Grant was facing intense competition in the United States and was forced to withdraw entirely from its Canadian operations. In 1976, Fields, a clothing retailer based in Vancouver, British Columbia, offered to purchase a 50.1 percent stake in Zellers for $32,675,000. Zellers' shareholders, unhappy with the idea of Zellers becoming a subsidiary of Fields, reversed the takeover and purchased Fields and its hardware store division, Marshall Wells. This sale added 70 Fields stores and 162 franchised Marshall Wells stores to the company. Fields president and founder, Joseph Segal was appointed as president of Zellers.

In June 1978, Zellers presented a bid to acquire 100 percent ownership of the Hudson's Bay Company (HBC). HBC management, recognizing Zellers profitability and the potential to enter a new retail segment, decided to purchase Zellers instead. Zellers and Fields, operating in very different retail segments from HBC, were kept intact and established as separate divisions of the company. HBC acquired full ownership of Zellers and Fields in 1981 and Marshall Wells in 1982. By 1985, HBC had sold Marshall Wells for $20 million because it was not relevant to its department store business. 

Counterfeit video games for the Atari 2600 were manufactured in Taiwan and sold by Zellers in the 1980s, usually under new names and artwork and occasionally with modified graphics. All games were pirated copies of titles created either by Atari itself or by third-party developers, such as Activision. Zellers was eventually forced by Atari to stop selling these games. Zellers released 18 games for the Atari 2600 in the early 1980s.

1990s: Further acquisitions
In 1990, Hudson's Bay Company acquired the 51 stores of the Towers/Bonimart chain from the Oshawa Group, and converted most of them to Zellers outlets, including its flagship location in Toronto. Zellers advertisements at the time featured both the Towers mascot, Sparky, and the Zellers mascot, Zeddy, walking arm in arm. During this period, Zellers used the slogan "Where the lowest price is the law."

In 1993, Hudson's Bay Company purchased the assets of the bankrupt Woodward's chain, including 21 store locations. These were converted into Zellers and The Bay stores and greatly expanded the company's presence in Western Canada. In 1998, Hudson's Bay Company acquired Kmart's Canadian division, and merged it with the Zellers division to create a larger combined chain under the Zellers name. While some Kmart locations were closed, many sites became full Zellers outlets. Kmart Canada president George Heller remained with HBC, eventually becoming HBC's president and CEO in the mid-2000s.

In 1996, Hudson's Bay Company closed its Zellers head office in Montreal, Quebec and merged it with the Hudson's Bay Company headquarters in downtown Toronto. By 1998, Hudson's Bay Company reestablished Zellers head office at the former Kmart Canada head office in Brampton, Ontario.

2000s: Decline
On February 28, 2006, Hudson's Bay Company was taken private by South Carolina businessman Jerry Zucker. In Hudson's Bay Company's last year as a publicly traded company, Zellers had 291 stores and lost $107 million on sales of $4.2 billion.

Mark Foote, who had headed general merchandise at Loblaw Companies and was president of Canadian Tire Corp's retail division, was appointed President and CEO of Zellers in 2008 and he was credited with stabilizing the chain, though it still struggled against Walmart Canada.

Following Zucker's death in 2008, Hudson's Bay Company and its subsidiaries including Zellers came under the ownership of a New York-based company, NRDC Equity Partners, which was headed by Richard Baker. NRDC also owned the Lord & Taylor upscale specialty retail department store chain in the United States. Subsequently, NRDC invested heavily in The Bay and managed a turnaround by repositioning it as an upscale, fashion forward retailer. However the Zellers chain was still struggling and was seen as a drag on the parent company and its American owner.

2011–2013: Lease acquisitions by Target, liquidation and closures

On January 13, 2011, it was announced that US. retail chain Target Corporation would purchase the lease agreements of up to 220 Zellers stores for $1.825 billion. Under the agreement, Zellers would sublease the properties and continue to operate them as Zellers locations until January 2012 at the earliest, and at the latest the end of March 2013. At the time of this announcement, Zellers operated 273 stores, well below the 350 stores it had in 1999.

Upon the announcement, it was reported that once the Zellers stores at these locations were closed, Target would renovate 100 to 150 of them to reopen the stores under the Target banner during 2013 and 2014. The remaining acquired sites would be transferred to other retailers. HBC had said that it would continue to operate the remaining Zellers stores as a smaller chain in specific communities.

Of the maximum 220 locations, 105 to be transferred to Target were identified in late May 2011, and another lot of 84 locations in late September 2011, bringing the total number of Zellers stores acquired by Target to 189. Of these 189 stores, 125–135 stores would be converted into Target stores, 39 others were resold to Walmart Canada, and the remaining 15–25 leases were either sold to other retailers or returned to the landlords who own the sites.

RioCan REIT was significantly affected, as many of its mall properties include Zellers locations. In addition, the United Food and Commercial Workers Union planned to hold demonstrations as many Zellers staffers were to be laid off instead of being retained by Target or Walmart. This was in marked contrast to the takeover of Woolco by Walmart in 1994, where all Woolco employees of the acquired stores were retained.

The President and CEO of Zellers, Mark Foote, had a mandate to liquidate the 273 Zellers stores in preparing it for Target's takeover by October 2011. Foote's strategy was to use a blueprint of a retail liquidation, but without the typical insolvency and desperation that plagued failing chains. Foote focused on raising profits, even if that meant losing market share and reducing store traffic, by ramping up inventory levels of higher margin goods over loss leaders such as apparel over deeply discounted paper towels and detergent, and slashing costs. Foote also replaced the expensive fall television ad campaign with a social media blitz on Facebook. Reportedly, the strategy was paying off as Zellers operating profit was "well ahead of expectations and the retailer had performed very well in 2011.

In March 2012, the first 50 Zellers stores were put in liquidation. This included all 39 Zellers stores slated to become Walmart outlets. By mid-June, the latter locations were closed to the public. On June 25, 2012, 17 more stores in Ontario were put in liquidation.

The Hudson's Bay Company announced on July 26, 2012, that it would close most of the 64 remaining stores that were supposed to continue operating as Zellers outlets. A company spokesperson stated that these stores employ 6,400 people, or approximately 100 per location, range in size from 48,000 to 128,000 square feet and are mostly in small towns. The closings of these stores were to happen at the latest on March 31, 2013 which coincided with the deadline date the HBC had to vacate the sites acquired by Target. The HBC's main reason for closing the 64 remaining stores was due to Zellers lack of profitability. The HBC also remarked that it would not be viable to keep Zellers as an ongoing chain due to the geographical locations of the remaining 64 stores. The HBC did not exclude the possibility of keeping some stores open and converting them as The Bay or Home Outfitters outlets.

After the deal with Target Corporation, HBC still a burden in half of the $226.4-million of Zellers lease obligations remaining through 2016, with the rent for 2012 alone being almost half of HBC's adjusted profit. With HBC preparing an initial public offering in late 2012, it either had terminated these liabilities with landlords at steep discounts or find new tenants to sublet the space.

The final closing Zellers stores started their liquidation sale on December 26, 2012 and the company stopped accepting returns on January 31, 2013. Liquidators sold nearly all of Zellers merchandise, store fixtures and shopping carts at discounted prices.

2013–2020: Liquidator 

In January 2013, HBC revised its strategy and decided to keep a total of three stores open under the Zellers banner after March 31, 2013. Originally these included the store at Place Bourassa in Montreal North, Quebec but it closed in early 2014. Replacing it was a previously closed Zellers in Nepean, Ontario, which reopened on April 3, 2014, keeping the number of stores at three. In September 2014, the last Zellers in Western Canada located at Semiahmoo Shopping Centre in Surrey, British Columbia was closed, leaving only two stores remaining nationwide: at Kipling Queensway Mall in Etobicoke, Ontario and Bells Corners in Nepean, Ontario. Both locations were closed by January 26, 2020.

These locations no longer operated as  discount department stores, but instead as liquidation outlets for sister chain The Bay. HBC communications manager Tiffany Bourré described these locations as featuring fashion apparel and a refined home product offering with more from other HBC banners.

2021–present: Pop-up shop and relaunch
In late August 2021, HBC relaunched the Zellers brand as a pop-up shop within a Hudson's Bay department store located at the Burlington Centre mall in Ontario. Essentially a store-within-a-store concept, it sports hanging Zellers logo banners, the classic red and white painted walls color scheme, and red floor lines to mark off one small section within the Hudsons Bay store. While offering a limited selection of goods, including Canada-branded apparel, bedding, housewares and toys, it mainly is intended to invoke a "fun and nostalgic experience" according to HBC. If proved successful, more locations could potentially use this concept in the future.

Subsequent reporting by trade publication Retail Insider indicates the pop-up location may have been prompted by trademark filings by an unrelated group that has opened two stores under the Zellers (as well as Kmart Canada) brands, after HBC allowed a trademark on the Zellers logo to expire in 2020; HBC is suing the group to prevent what it alleges to be unauthorized use of a brand that it still controls.

A year after the pop-up shop opened, HBC announced Zellers will be returning both as an e-commerce website and physical space within select Hudson Bay stores across Canada in early 2023. However retail analysts believe the re-introduction of Zellers is primarily due to HBC's lawsuit over protection of its trademark, using this as a demonstration of ownership of the brand, and doubts any successful expansion or revitalization of the former chain.

Stores

Zellers operated stores from St. John's, Newfoundland, to Victoria, British Columbia and employed over 35,000 people. The average store size was 94,000 square feet (8,700 m2). Zellers Select stores were designed for smaller markets with populations under 25,000, with stores averaged 45,000 square feet (4,200 m2). Some multi-level stores were equipped with a shopping cart system known as the Cartveyor, designed to transport shopping carts between floors next to a standard escalator, while there were few that were so small, they were equipped with elevators open to shoppers, such as with the Lawrence Square Shopping Centre location in the North York district of Toronto (the mall is renamed Lawrence Allen Centre in 2019).

In July 2010, Zellers unveiled prototype store designs in five Winnipeg locations, with two more originally planned for late 2010 and early 2011. One store opened on the lower floor of the downtown Winnipeg Bay store making it the first Bay Zellers hybrid store in the HBC family of stores.

Restaurant
The Skillet, Zellers in-store restaurant brand, launched in 1960. The restaurants underwent several revisions and were branded as Zellers Family Restaurant before their demise.

Pharmacy
Almost every Zellers location had a pharmacy in it with a few stores in Quebec also having them. Prescription records were sold to other pharmacies in 2011 and Zellers pharmacies ceased operation throughout 2012. Zellers was subject to controversy regarding its sale of patient records.

Liquidation centres
Although Zellers remained open until 2020 as a store liquidator for Hudson's Bay and Home Outfitters, the Zellers chain had also operated a few liquidation centres for its own merchandise. Those were typically former regular Zellers stores that had been converted as liquidation centres for a limited time before closing down for good. The Zellers Family restaurants continued operating in these liquidation centres.

Products
Products sold at Zellers included clothing, grocery, toys, electronics, furniture, and home supplies.

Grocery
All Zellers sold basic groceries such as dry snacks and other prepackaged foods. The Neighbourhood Market, which used to be available at some locations, was Zellers expanded section of grocery items, which included frozen and dairy aisles. Prototype stores in Winnipeg featured full grocery departments including fresh produce and baked goods. Such plans were dropped following Target Canada's acquisition of many Zellers leases. Some stores removed their The Neighbourhood Market section.

Exclusive labels
Zellers carried many of its own labels and also had exclusive rights in Canada to some other labels:

Acquired labels
Some labels exclusive to Target Corporation in the United States were previously exclusive to Zellers in Canada. After Target's acquisition of Zellers leases until its closure, Target Canada became the exclusive store for the following brands:
Cherokee
Mossimo
Wabasso

However, Target Canada closed in 2015, leaving Wabasso, and Mossimo unavailable in Canada since then. Cherokee was then carried by Sears Canada for a short period, until it too closed in January 2018. With the demise of Zellers, Target Canada and Sears Canada, these brands are no longer carried in Canada.

Customer service
On January 6, 2012, CBC Television's Marketplace announced that Zellers received the title of Canada's Worst Customer Service as a department store, based on a survey conducted by CBC with the Léger Marketing research firm in eight metropolitan areas. The retailer refused to be interviewed by Marketplace host Erica Johnson regarding its ranking, providing her with a written statement instead. Zellers also did not offer a refund to the mystery shopper who bought a used coffeemaker that was presented as new, and attempted to return the product after the advertised 30 day return period. Zellers Customer Service did not respond to this customer's Twitter message seeking satisfactory resolution.

Advertising
Zellers ran a Festive Finale advertising campaign in late 2011. Zeddy was also used as a mascot to advertise the retailer's toy selection.

Festive Finale
The Festive Finale campaign was used to advertise Zellers last Christmas and holiday season sale in December 2011. There was a website called Zellers Facebook.ca which allowed customers to vote for their favourite coupon and musical genre. While Zellers recommended that customers have a Facebook account and Like the company, both of these steps were optional. It was also possible to record a radio commercial for Zellers Moonlight Madness sale by using a computer microphone and reading the site's teleprompter. Zellers also had social networking service accounts on Twitter and YouTube. Festive Finale was criticized for its Boxing Week coupon.

Loyalty program
As a Hudson's Bay Company subsidiary, Zellers promoted the Hudson's Bay Rewards program also available at Hudson's Bay and Home Outfitters. It had been known as Club Z and HBC Rewards. The program used a points card, available at no charge but only accepted by Zellers and other partners. A Hudson's Bay MasterCard issued by Capital One is also available, which rewards customers with one point per dollar spent on the card at any retailer. Any Zellers cashier failing to inform a customer about the HBC MasterCard had to give that customer 10,000 HBC points. This is equivalent to 250 Hudson's Bay points, or one eighth of the requirement for a $10 gift card. Hudson's Bay points can still be redeemed for Hudson's Bay gift cards.

Slogans
Numerous slogans were used by Zellers:
 Early 1980s: The low prices of Zellers are in the news (Zellers low prices are making headlines)
 1980s: Only you'll know how little you paid
 1980s: Shopping anywhere else is pointless
 Late 1980s and 1990s: Where the lowest price is the law!, followed by Where the lowest price is the law...everyday! and Because the lowest price is the law.
 1990s: Truly Canadian
 1997–2000: Better and Better
 2000–2013: Everything from A to Z

Zeddy

Zeddy is a teddy bear mascot used by Zellers all over Canada. He was first used in 1986 as an advertising campaign, and then rose to his popularity by the early 1990s. The main purpose of Zeddy was to advertise Toyland, the toy section in Zellers stores. Zellers provided a stuffed Zeddy bear for any child who had a birthday party sponsored by Zellers. There was also a Zellers employee in a giant Zeddy costume hosting the party. Lineup toys of Zeddy were also created. In the final months before the last of the Zellers stores were closed permanently, the company distributed large batches of stuffed Zeddy Bears for sale in stores throughout the network.

Many stores feature a Zeddy Wheel ride, which accommodates one young child on a miniature ferris wheel type ride. The ride costs $1 and plays carnival music when in use. When no one is riding the wheel, Zeddy says on a regular basis, "Come ride with me! All aboard the Zeddy Wheel!" in an attempt to attract customers.  Despite Zeddy being withdrawn as Zellers official mascot in 2005, the Zeddy Wheel remained in operation at stores featuring it unless it is out of service, and the voice track was unchanged over the years. Some wheels removed the big Zeddy sticker in favour of multiple, small generic stickers.

Zeddy remains used as a baby brand for products such as diapers and baby bath products.

During the Festive Finale campaign in 2011, Zeddy was reintroduced in weekly flyers for Zellers Toyland before closing their stores for Target or Walmart. The character was used as a static picture, but no animated television commercials of him were made during this season. However, some employees decided to wear the Zeddy costume to celebrate the return of this teddy bear. Shortly thereafter, in December 2011, Zellers launched a Zeddy Bucks promotion. Those who spent at least $50 before taxes on toys received a pair of red 2012 Summer Olympics mittens, plus a $10 Zeddy Bucks voucher. This voucher could only be used on a later date.

With the last Zellers stores set to close in 2013, the Hudson's Bay Company announced in September 2012 that it was looking for a charity organization to adopt Zeddy so that the mascot could live on after Zellers. In a social media ad campaign, Zellers Everything Must GO Including Zeddy, Zeddy was featured in an online video where the mascot was abandoned in the woods by a Zellers executive telling Zeddy that Zellers was liquidating, and everything must go, including him. Organizations were invited to submit on Zellers Facebook page what their plans for Zeddy were. There were over 30,000 votes, and the final three contenders were Autism Ontario, Camp Trillium and Cystic Fibrosis Canada. Voters selected Camp Trillium as the winner and chosen adopter. There are several notable Zeddy iterations including most famously, bush pilot Zeddy.

Zeddy, on the far right, is walking in a parade in 2003.
Zeddy appears in the Toyland section of Toyland in November 2011.

See also

Other former discount retailer that once operated in Canada and similar concept as Zellers:
 Kmart Canada opened its first store in 1929 as Kresge and closed Canadian operations in 1998; some of its stores sold to Zellers
 Woolco appeared in the 1960s and closed operations completely in 1994; most stores sold to Walmart, some later acquired by Zellers
 Towers Department Stores emerged in 1960 and ceased operations in 1991; all stores sold to Zellers 
 Horizon, a competitor created by the T. Eaton Company, that operated from 1972 to 1978. 
 Target Canada opened in 2013 after acquiring a number of former Zellers leases (it ceased operations two years later, in 2015).
 Retail apocalypse
 List of retailers affected by the retail apocalypse

References

External links

Zellers history at Hudson's Bay Company website

Canadian brands
Companies based in Brampton
Defunct retail companies of Canada
Defunct companies of Ontario
Department stores of Canada
Hudson's Bay Company
Retail companies established in 1931
1931 establishments in Ontario
2013 disestablishments in Ontario
1978 mergers and acquisitions
Retail companies disestablished in 2013